Bołądź is a Polish surname. Notable people with this surname include:

 Bartłomiej Bołądź (born 1994), Polish volleyball player
 Olga Bołądź (born 1984), Polish actress

See also
 

Polish-language surnames